Sacred Silence is a 1919 American silent drama film directed by Harry F. Millarde and starring William Russell and Agnes Ayres.

Cast
 William Russell
 Agnes Ayres 
 George MacQuarrie
 James Morrison - Lt. Ralph Harrison 
 Tom Brooke
 Mabel Julienne Scott

References

External links 

lobby poster

1919 films
American silent feature films
American black-and-white films
Fox Film films
Silent American drama films
1919 drama films
Films directed by Harry F. Millarde
1910s American films